John Bigge (fl. 1411–1421) was an English politician.

He was a Member (MP) of the Parliament of England for Lincoln in 1411, 1416, 1420 and 1421.

In 1421 he was appointed Recorder of Lincoln.

References

14th-century births
15th-century deaths
People from Lincoln, England
English MPs 1411
English MPs March 1416
English MPs 1420
English MPs May 1421